Super Hits compiles all 9 singles that Glen Campbell released on Atlantic Records (1982–1986) plus "I Love My Truck" which was released as a single A-side in 1981 (Mirage Records).

Track listing
 "I Love My Truck" (Joe Rainey) - 2:58
 "Old Home Town" (David Pomeranze) - 3:43
 "I Love How You Love Me" (Barry Mann, Larry Kolber) - 2:35
 "Faithless Love" (John David Souther) - 3:16
 "On The Wings Of My Victory" (Bob Corbin) - 3:35
 "(Love Always) Letter To Home" (Carl Jackson) - 2:56
 "A Lady Like You" (Jim Weatherly, Keigh Stegall) - 3:34
 "Cowpoke" (Stan Jones) - 2:46
 "It's Just A Matter Of Time" (Brook Benton, Belford Hendricks, Clyde Otis) - 2:28
 "Call Home" (Troy Seals. Mike Reid) - 3:29

Production
Compilation production - Mike Griffith
Art direction - Aimee McMahan
Design - George Otvos
Photography - Alan A. Taylor

2000 greatest hits albums
Glen Campbell compilation albums
Atlantic Records compilation albums